Hıjran Alı "Ejo" Boyacı (born 11 January 2005) is a professional footballer who plays as a midfielder. Born in Canada, he is a youth international for Turkey.

Career
Boyaci is a product of the BTB Soccer Academy in Edmonton, Alberta in Canada and moved to Turkey with Adana Demirspor's youth side. He made his professional debut with them in a 7–0 Süper Lig win over Göztepe, coming on as a substitute in the 72nd minute.

International career
Boyacı was born in Canada and is of Turkish descent. He is a youth international for Turkey, having represented the Turkey U17s.

References

External links
 
 

2005 births
Living people
Citizens of Turkey through descent
Turkish footballers
Turkey youth international footballers
Canadian soccer players
Canadian people of Turkish descent
Association football midfielders
Adana Demirspor footballers
Süper Lig players